Daan Breeuwsma (born 29 December 1987) is a Dutch male short-track speed-skater.

His partner is short track speed skater Rianne de Vries, who was also part of the national team at the 2014 Winter Olympics.

References

External links

Daan Breeuwsma's profile , from http://www.sochi2014.com . Retrieved 18 February 2014.

1987 births
Living people
Dutch male short track speed skaters
Olympic short track speed skaters of the Netherlands
Short track speed skaters at the 2014 Winter Olympics
Short track speed skaters at the 2018 Winter Olympics
Sportspeople from Heerenveen
World Short Track Speed Skating Championships medalists
21st-century Dutch people